Erigeron arizonicus  is a species of flowering plant in the family Asteraceae known by the common name Arizona fleabane. It is native to the southwestern United States (Arizona, New Mexico) and northwestern Mexico (Sonora).

Erigeron arizonicus   is a perennial herb up to 60 cm (2 feet) tall, spreading by means of underground rhizomes. It produces 1-6 flower heads per branch, each head containing 25–80 white ray florets and many small yellow disc florets.

References

External links
photo of herbarium specimen at Missouri Botanical Garden, collected in New Mexico in 1881, isotype of Erigeron rusbyi

arizonicus
Flora of Arizona
Flora of Sonora
Flora of New Mexico
Plants described in 1883